We Got Married (Season 2) is the second season of We Got Married (우리 결혼했어요), a popular reality South Korean variety show and a segment of the Sunday Sunday Night program. First broadcast in 2008, the show pairs up Korean celebrities to show what life would be like if they were married. Each week, couples are assigned missions to complete, with candid interviews of the participants to reveal their thoughts and feelings.

With a new format and slightly different couples, newlyweds are given a mission to complete each week. As during the special pilot episode, interviewed participants provide a unique perspective on the ongoing relationship conflicts and developments. All of the recorded material is then played in front of the participants, MCs, and audience who add commentary or clarification.

About
As of May 2009, the producers announced another change in the format with all four couples departing, cutting down to just one couple and shortening the show to just 60 minutes. The show will now portray a more realistic side to what a marriage is, instead of "the painted image of marriage based on romance". For the first time, a real couple is cast in the show. Guest celebrities are invited to be show's commentators for each episode so that they can share their opinions on marriage on behalf of their age group. Kim Yong Jun and Hwang Jung Eum also do the interview room together dressed in wedding attire.

However, due to low ratings, the show returned to its old format with the addition of a make-believe couple actor Park Jae-jung and After School member Uee on August 2, 2009. For the Chuseok special, Brown Eyed Girls' Gain & 2AM's Jo Kwon and SG Wannabe's Lee Seok Hun & host Kim Na Young appeared as two new couples. The episode achieved Season II's highest rating, and Gain and Jo Kwon were announced to be a permanent couple.

Original couple
 Kim Yong-jun & Hwang Jung-eum (Ep 1-31)

Additional couples
 Park Jae-jung & Uee (Ep 12-31)
 Jo Kwon & Gain (Ep 21-80)
 Lee Seok-hoon & Kim Na-young (Ep 21)
 Lee Sun-ho & Hwang Woo-seul-hye (ep 19-29)
 Jung Yong-hwa & Seohyun (ep 40-91)
 Nichkhun & Victoria (ep 52-91)

Season II episode summaries

References

External links 
 Official Website

We Got Married
2009 South Korean television seasons
2010 South Korean television seasons
2011 South Korean television seasons